The 1967 World Sportscar Championship season were the 15th season of FIA World Sportscar Championship racing.  It featured the International Championship for Sports-Prototypes and the International Championship for Sports Cars. The former was open to  Group 6 Sports-Prototypes and the latter to Group 4 Sports Cars. The season ran from 4 February 1967 to 3 September 1967 and comprised 14 races in total.

This was the last championship season to include a hill climb event, due to safety concerns. Also, growing speed at Le Mans caused a controversial CSI decision to limit the engine capacity of Group 6 Sports-Prototypes to 3 litres, beginning in 1968.

Schedule
Although the season was composed of 14 races, not all races counted as rounds for both championships and each class did not compete in all events. Some events also included classes for GT cars and Touring Cars although these cars were not eligible to score championship points.

Races

Results

Manufacturers' Championship

All championships scored points to the top six competitors in each class, in the order of 9-6-4-3-2-1. Only the best five finishes counted towards the championship, with skipped points marked in parentheses.

Manufacturers were only awarded points for their highest finishing car, but other finishers from the same manufacturer could prevent competitors from scoring points. For example, at Daytona, Ferrari scored a 1-2-3 result with 9 points awarded in the P+2.0 category, followed by two 2000cc Porsche prototypes which received 3 points (plus 9 in the P2.0 Division), and the 6th-best prototype, a Ford Mk.II in 7th overall, collected a single point.

Prototypes over 2000 cc
This championship was for all Prototype class cars over 2000 cc.

Controversy arose about the Mirage of John Wyer, which had won at Spa. As it was a modified Ford GT40 with Ford engines, Ford argued that it should count towards Ford's tally. As the CSI declined and Ford had no realistic chances to defend the championship without those points, Ford concentrated the solely on Le Mans and did not send its prototypes to the Nurburgring or Brands Hatch events.

Prototypes under 2000 cc
This championship was for all Prototype class cars under 2000 cc.

International Championship for Sports Cars

Championship points were awarded on a 9-6-4-3-2-1 for the first six positions in each relevant division at each race except for the Swiss Mountain Grand Prix at which half points were awarded. Only the highest placed car from each manufacturer in each division was eligible to score points for its manufacturer. Not all race results could be counted towards the championship totals and discarded points are shown within brackets in the table below.

Notes and references

External links
 1967 Championship race results at wspr-racing.com
 1967 Championship images and race programs at www.racingsportscars.com

World Sportscar Championship seasons
World Sportscar Championship season